Habakkuk 2 is the second chapter of the Book of Habakkuk in the Hebrew Bible or the Old Testament of the Christian Bible. This book contains the prophecies attributed to the prophet Habakkuk, and is a part of the Book of the Twelve Minor Prophets. This chapter and the previous one form a unit, which Marvin Sweeney sees as "a report of a dialogue between the prophet and YHWH" about the fate of Judah, which biblical scholars, such as F. F. Bruce, label as "the oracle of Habakkuk".

Text
The original text was written in Hebrew language. This chapter is divided into 20 verses.

The Taunting Riddle 
The melitzah ḥidah, or the taunting riddle, is the oracle revealed to Habakkuk the prophet. It is a mashal or a parable. It is also known as a witty satire. The riddle is 15 verses long from verse 6 to verse 20 and is divided into five woes which consist of three verses each.

Hebrew Bible version
Following is the Hebrew text of Habakkuk 2:6-20:

King James Version
 6. Shall not all these take up a parable against him, and a taunting proverb against him, and say, Woe to him that increaseth that which is not his! how long? and to him that ladeth himself with thick clay!
 7. Shall they not rise up suddenly that shall bite thee, and awake that shall vex thee, and thou shalt be for booties unto them?
 8. Because thou hast spoiled many nations, all the remnant of the people shall spoil thee; because of men's blood, and for the violence of the land, of the city, and of all that dwell therein.
 9. Woe to him that coveteth an evil covetousness to his house, that he may set his nest on high, that he may be delivered from the power of evil!
 10. Thou hast consulted shame to thy house by cutting off many people, and hast sinned against thy soul.
 11. For the stone shall cry out of the wall, and the beam out of the timber shall answer it.
 12. Woe to him that buildeth a town with blood, and stablisheth a city by iniquity!
 13. Behold, is it not of the LORD of hosts that the people shall labour in the very fire, and the people shall weary themselves for very vanity?
 14. For the earth shall be filled with the knowledge of the glory of the LORD, as the waters cover the sea.
 15. Woe unto him that giveth his neighbour drink, that puttest thy bottle to him, and makest him drunken also, that thou mayest look on their nakedness!
 16. Thou art filled with shame for glory: drink thou also, and let thy foreskin be uncovered: the cup of the LORD's right hand shall be turned unto thee, and shameful spewing shall be on thy glory.
 17. For the violence of Lebanon shall cover thee, and the spoil of beasts, which made them afraid, because of men's blood, and for the violence of the land, of the city, and of all that dwell therein.
 18. What profiteth the graven image that the maker thereof hath graven it; the molten image, and a teacher of lies, that the maker of his work trusteth therein, to make dumb idols?
 19. Woe unto him that saith to the wood, Awake; to the dumb stone, Arise, it shall teach! Behold, it is laid over with gold and silver, and there is no breath at all in the midst of it.
 20. But the LORD is in his holy temple: let all the earth keep silence before him.

Textual witnesses
Some early manuscripts containing the text of this chapter in Hebrew language are found among the Dead Sea Scrolls, i.e., 1QpHab, known as the "Habakkuk Commentary" (later half of the 1st century BC), and of the Masoretic Text tradition, which includes Codex Cairensis (895 CE), the Petersburg Codex of the Prophets (916), Aleppo Codex (10th century), Codex Leningradensis (1008). Fragments containing parts of this chapter in Hebrew were found among the Dead Sea Scrolls, including 4Q82 (4QXIIg; 25 BCE) with extant verses 4?; and Wadi Murabba'at Minor Prophets (Mur88; MurXIIProph; 75-100 CE) with extant verses 2–3, 5–11, 18–20.

There is also a translation into Koine Greek known as the Septuagint, made in the last few centuries BC. Extant ancient manuscripts of the Septuagint version include Codex Vaticanus (B; B; 4th century), Codex Sinaiticus (S; BHK: S; 4th century), Codex Alexandrinus (A; A; 5th century) and Codex Marchalianus (Q; Q; 6th century). Fragments containing parts of this chapter in Greek were found among the Dead Sea Scrolls, that is, Naḥal Ḥever 8Ḥev1 (8ḤevXIIgr); late 1st century BCE) with extant verses 1–8, 13–20.

Verse 4
 Behold, his soul which is lifted up is not upright in him:
 but the just shall live by his faith.

 "But the just shall live by his faith" is translated from the Hebrew (consisting of three words in Masoretic Text) וצדיק באמונתו יחיה (Transliteration: we-tza-dik be-e-mo-na-to yeh-yeh). This part is quoted in three verses of the New Testament: Romans 1:17, Galatians 3:11, and Hebrews 10:38. In Romans and Galatians Paul extends Habakkuk's original concept of righteous living at the present time into a future life, whereas in Epistle to the Hebrews Habakkuk's vision is tied to Christ and used to comfort the church during a period of persecution. These three epistles are considered to be "the three great doctrinal books of the New Testament," and Habakkuk's statement concerning faith forms the backbone of each book.

Verse 20 
  But the Lord is in his holy temple:
 let all the earth keep silence before him.

The Christian hymn "The Lord is in His Holy Temple", written by William J. Kirkpatrick in 1900, is based on this verse.

See also 
 Related Bible parts: Romans 1, Galatians 3, Hebrews 10

References

Sources

 
 
 Bruce, F.F. Habakkuk. In: The Minor Prophets: An Exegetical and Expository Commentary. Thomas Edward McComiskey (Ed.). Baker Academic. 2009.

External links 

Historic manuscripts
 The Commentary on Habakkuk Scroll, The Digital Dead Sea Scrolls, hosted by the Israel Museum, Jerusalem.

Jewish translations
 Chavakuk – Habakkuk (Judaica Press) translation [with Rashi's commentary] at Chabad.org

Christian translations
Online Bible at GospelHall.org (ESV, KJV, Darby, American Standard Version, Bible in Basic English)
  Various versions

Further information
 A Brief Introduction to The Prophecy of Habakkuk for Contemporary Readers (Christian Perspective)
 Introduction to the book of Habakkuk from the NIV Study Bible
 Introduction to the Book of HabakkukForward Movement Publications

02